is a South Korean professional footballer who last played for the Singaporean club Singapore Armed Forces.

Club career

South Korea
He began his football career with South Korean club Chunnam Dragons in 1999. He played only 1 league game with Chunnam.

Singapore
In 2001, Park moved to S. League in Singapore, and joined Jurong FC. He finished as Jurong's top goalscorer with 24 goals in his debut season. Throughout a three-year spell at Jurong, he scored a total of 44 goals.

Park joined Balestier Khalsa in 2004, but he moved to Woodlands Wellington a year later.

At Woodlands, he scored 40 goals in four seasons, and in 2008, became only the eighth player to score 100 goals in the S.League.

From 2009, he joined Singapore Armed Forces.

Honours

Club

Woodlands Wellington
League Cup:2007

Individual
100 S.League Goals: 2008

External links
sleague.com
safwarriors.com.sg
data2.7m.cn

safwarriors.com.sg

1977 births
Living people
South Korean footballers
South Korean expatriate footballers
South Korean expatriate sportspeople in Singapore
Expatriate footballers in Singapore
Jeonnam Dragons players
Balestier Khalsa FC players
Woodlands Wellington FC players
Warriors FC players
K League 1 players
Singapore Premier League players
Jurong FC players
Association football midfielders